Geist is a surname. Notable people with the surname include:

 Bill Geist (born 1945), American author, columnist and journalist
 Christian Geist (c. 1650–1711), German composer and organist
 Clarence H. Geist (1866–1938), American financier
 George Geist (born 1955), American politician
 Joel Geist (born 1982), American actor
 Kaufman Geist, (1895–1948) American track and field athlete
 Michael Geist (born 1968), Canadian academic
 Otto W. Geist (1888–1963), German archaeologist, explorer, and naturalist
 Raymond H. Geist (1885–1955) American diplomat
 Richard Geist (1944–2019), American politician
 Valerius Geist (1938–2021), Canadian biologist
 Willie Geist (born 1975), American television personality

Surnames